{{DISPLAYTITLE:C8H10}}
The molecular formula C8H10 may refer to:4 structural isomers

 Cycloocta-1,3,6-triene
 Ethylbenzene
 Octatetraene
 Xylenes
 m-Xylene
 o-Xylene
 p-Xylene